Bernadette J. Brooten is an American religious scholar and Kraft-Hiatt Professor of Christian Studies at Brandeis University.

Biography
Brooten graduated from University of Portland with a B.A., and Harvard University with a Ph.D. in 1982.
She studied theology at the University of Tübingen and at Hebrew University.
She taught at the Claremont Graduate School, the University of Tübingen, Harvard Divinity School, and the University of Oslo with a 1998 Fulbright Fellowship.
She served on the Advisory Committee for the Women's Studies in Religion Program at Harvard Divinity School from 1997 to 2008.

Brooten is the founder and director of the Feminist Sexual Ethics Project at Brandeis.  The project aims to create Jewish, Christian, and Muslim sexual ethics rooted in freedom, mutuality, meaningful consent, responsibility, and female (as well as male) pleasure, untainted by slave-holding values.  These religions' sacred texts and traditions have all tolerated slavery, which has frequently involved the sexual exploitation of women and girls.  Brooten heads a team of scholars, activists, artists, and policy analysts who are disentangling the nexus of slavery, religion, women, and sexuality.  They aim to help religious and other people complete the abolition of slavery and move beyond harmful racial and sexual stereotypes.

Her work is located primarily within the New Testament, post-biblical Judaism, early literature and history, women and religion, and feminist sexual ethics (with a particular focus on law and sexuality).  Her books have won numerous awards and she has been recognized for her service to the field of Biblical Literature.

She is currently writing a book on early Christian women who were enslaved or who owned enslaved laborers.

Awards
 1998 MacArthur Fellows Program
 National Endowment for the Humanities Fellowship

Selected works
"The modern face of slavery", The Boston Globe, November 19, 2006
 Beyond Slavery: Overcoming Its Religious and Sexual Legacies, Palgrave-MacMillan, 2010, 
 Women Leaders in The Ancient Synagogue: Inscriptional Evidence and Background Issues, Scholars Press, 1982, 
 Love Between Women: Early Christian Responses to Female Homoeroticism, University of Chicago Press, 1996, 
"Female Homoeroticism", Immaculate & powerful: the female in sacred image and social reality, Editors Clarissa W. Atkinson, Constance H. Buchanan, Margaret Ruth Miles, Beacon Press, 1985, 
 "Acts of the Apostles", Women priests: a Catholic commentary on the Vatican declaration, Editors Leonard J. Swidler, Arlene Swidler, Paulist Press, 1977, 
Frauen in der Männerkirche, Editors Bernadette Brooten, Norbert Greinacher, Kaiser, 1982,

References

External links
"Hot Potato: An Interview with Bernadette J. Brooten", International Journal of Sexuality and Gender Studies, Springer Netherlands, ISSN 1566-1768, Volume 3, Number 4, October, 1998

Living people
Brandeis University faculty
University of Portland alumni
Harvard University alumni
Claremont McKenna College faculty
Academic staff of the University of Tübingen
MacArthur Fellows
Academic staff of the University of Oslo
German women academics
21st-century American historians
American women historians
Year of birth missing (living people)
21st-century American women
Historians from California